La Jornada (The Working Day) is one of Mexico City's leading daily newspapers. It was established in 1984 by Carlos Payán Velver. The current editor (directora general) is Carmen Lira Saade. La Jornada has presence in eight states of the Mexican Republic with local editions in Aguascalientes, Guerrero, Jalisco, Michoacán, Morelos, San Luis Potosí, Puebla and Veracruz (La Jornada de Oriente). As of 2006 it had approximately 287,000 readers in  Mexico City, and, according to them, their website has approximately 180,000 daily page views.

The online version was launched in 1995, with no restrictions on access and a Google-based search that includes the historic archives of the newspaper. The website is hosted by the National Autonomous University of Mexico (UNAM).

Contributors 

Many of the newspaper's editorialists have academic affiliations with the UNAM or the Colegio de México.

Julio Hernández López
Jose Steinsleger
Ximena Bedregal (editor of Triple Jornada)
Eduardo Galeano (former contributor)
Miguel Angel Rivera
Carlos Fernández-Vega
Alfredo Jalife Rahme
Julio Boltvinik
Marlene Santos
Patricia Peñaloza
Mario Di Costanzo
Gustavo Iruegas
Iván Restrepo
Antonio Helguera
Arnoldo Kraus
Enrique Galvan Ochoa
Carlos Fazio
Gustavo Esteva
León Bendesky
Elena Poniatowska
Hermann Bellinghausen
José Cueli
Leonardo Garcia Tsao
Mario Benedetti
Carlos Monsivais
Joan Martinez Alier
John Saxe Fernandez
Abraham Nuncio Limón
Verónica Murguía editor of the bi-weekly column “Las rayas de la cebra” since 2000 

It occasionally translates and includes op-eds from Robert Fisk, Noam Chomsky, James Petras, Howard Zinn, Greg Palast and others. Fidel Castro also repeatedly contributed to the newspaper as an author.

Reception

Noam Chomsky described 'La Jornada'' as "maybe the only real independent newspaper in the hemisphere".

See also
Carmen Aristegui
 List of newspapers in Mexico

References

Further reading

External links
 Official website
 English translations of La Jornada articles available at nonprofit WorldMeets.US

1984 establishments in Mexico
Newspapers published in Mexico City
Publications established in 1984
Spanish-language newspapers